Laodamia is a genus of snout moths. It is sometimes listed as a subgenus of Oncocera.

Species
 Laodamia affinis Balinsky, 1994
 Laodamia bibasella de Joannis, 1927
 Laodamia conisella Hampson, 1926
 Laodamia cupronigrella Caradja, 1925
 Laodamia dubia Balinsky, 1994
 Laodamia eulepidella (Hampson, 1896)
 Laodamia faecella (Zeller, 1839)
 Laodamia floridana de Joannis, 1927
 Laodamia glaucocephalis Balinsky, 1994
 Laodamia grisella Balinsky, 1994
 Laodamia homotypa Balinsky, 1994
 Laodamia horrens Balinsky, 1994
 Laodamia hortensis Balinsky, 1994
 Laodamia hypolepias de Joannis, 1927
 Laodamia ignicephalis Balinsky, 1994
 Laodamia inermis Balinsky, 1994
 Laodamia injucunda Balinsky, 1994
 Laodamia karkloofensis Balinsky, 1994
 Laodamia leucosticta de Joannis, 1927
 Laodamia lugubris Balinsky, 1994
 Laodamia natalensis (Ragonot, 1888)
 Laodamia nigerrima Balinsky, 1994
 Laodamia nonplagella Balinsky, 1994
 Laodamia ochreomelanella (Ragonot, 1888)
 Laodamia polygraphella de Joannis, 1927
 Laodamia pulchra Balinsky, 1994
 Laodamia salisburyensis Balinsky, 1994
 Laodamia sarniensis Balinsky, 1994
 Laodamia scalaris de Joannis, 1927
 Laodamia similis Balinsky, 1994
 Laodamia spiculata Balinsky, 1994
 Laodamia spissa Balinsky, 1994
 Laodamia squamata Balinsky, 1994
 Laodamia zoetendalensis Balinsky, 1994

References

Phycitini
Pyralidae genera
Taxa named by Émile Louis Ragonot